The 2020 Missouri Tigers football team represented the University of Missouri in the 2020 NCAA Division I FBS football season. The Tigers played their home games at Faurot Field in Columbia, Missouri, and competed in the Eastern Division of the Southeastern Conference (SEC). They were led by first-year head coach Eliah Drinkwitz.

In a season impacted by the COVID-19 pandemic, the Tigers compiled a 5–5 record, all in conference games. The team was set to face Iowa in the Music City Bowl, but had to withdraw due to COVID-19 issues.

Previous season
The Tigers finished the 2019 season 6–6, 3–5 in SEC play to finish in a tie for fourth place in the Eastern Division. Head coach Barry Odom was fired on November 30, 2019 following an overall four-year record of 25–25 and SEC record of 13–19. Eliah Drinkwitz was hired on December 10 following a 12–1 conference championship season at Appalachian State.

Preseason

Award watch lists
Listed in the order that they were released

SEC Media Days
In the preseason media poll, Missouri was predicted to finish in sixth place in the East Division.

Personnel

Staff

Roster

Schedule
Missouri had games scheduled against BYU, Central Arkansas, Eastern Michigan, and Louisiana, which were all canceled due to the COVID-19 pandemic.

The game between Missouri and LSU was originally scheduled to take place in Baton Rouge, Louisiana.  However, in light of Hurricane Delta, the game was moved to Columbia.
The game between Vanderbilt and Missouri was originally scheduled to take place on October 17.  However, due to COVID-19 management requirements in response to positive tests and subsequent quarantine of individuals within the Vanderbilt program, the game was rescheduled for December 12. The SEC postponed Tennessee vs. Vanderbilt to facilitate the rescheduling of the Vanderbilt-Missouri game. The shuffling allows for the opportunity for all 14 SEC teams to play 10 regular-season games.

Games Summaries

No. 2 Alabama

at No. 21 Tennessee

No. 17 LSU

Kentucky

at No. 10 Florida

at South Carolina

Vanderbilt

Arkansas

No. 9 Georgia

at Mississippi State 

Statistics

Rankings

Players drafted into the NFL

References

Missouri
Missouri Tigers football seasons
Missouri Tigers football